Pretty Pretty Princess is a board game for young children with a fantasy/role-play theme. It is produced by Winning Moves Games USA.

Game specifications
 Ages: 5 and up
 Number of Players: 2-4
 Playing Time: 20-30 Minutes
 Package Contents: Board, Jewelry box (lid includes spinner and mirror), Crown, 4 Pawns, 21 Jewelry pieces (4 each Necklaces/Bracelets/Earrings, 5 Rings), 2 Sheets Labels

Summary of play
Pretty Pretty Princess is a turn-based game. Initially the players spin to see who moves first, and then play continues clockwise. Players spin the spinner to advance around the game board while attempting to collect a complete set of jewelry by landing on spaces associated with each piece. The game ends when a player has a complete set of jewelry in their chosen color, plus the crown. There is a black ring which does not belong to any color set: if a player holds the black ring when the game ends, they lose.

Pretty Pretty Princess does not require reading or complex counting skills, and contains no electronics or mechanical components. The jewelry pieces are sized so that children of appropriate age to play can wear them as the game progresses, encouraging imaginative play.

History
Pretty Pretty Princess was invented in 1989 by Elizabeth Pacza, a designer at a Chicago-based content creator Meyer/Glass Design, Ltd. Originally licensed to Western Publishing Group in 1989, where Peggy Brown handled internal development. The game was released in 1990. Hasbro acquired the property in 1994 as part of its purchase of the games unit of Western. Hasbro has since marketed the game under its Milton Bradley imprint.

Multiple special editions of Pretty Pretty Princess have been produced, including licensed Disney variants such as Sleeping Beauty and Cinderella versions. As of 2014, the game was not in print, although "Pretty Pretty Princess" was still a registered trademark of Hasbro, Inc. Hasbro licensed the game to Winning Moves in 2018.  it is still in production.

References

External links
Official rules

Board games introduced in 1990